Naungkut is the name of several villages in Burma:

Naungkut (24°43"N 95°42"E), Banmauk Township
Naungkut (24°32"N 95°33"E), Banmauk Township